Aniq Raushan (born 5 October 2003) is a Singaporean footballer currently playing as a right-back for Lion City Sailors F.C.

Club

Lion City Sailors
He made his debut against Balestier Khalsa.

Career statistics

Club

Notes

International Statistics

U19 International caps

References

2003 births
Living people
Singaporean footballers
Association football defenders
Singapore Premier League players
Lion City Sailors FC players